Sepatan is a district within Tangerang Regency in the province of Banten, Java, Indonesia. The population in 2010 was 92,353.

Tangerang Regency
Districts of Banten
Populated places in Banten